Flabellina affinis is a species of sea slug, an aeolid nudibranch, a marine gastropod mollusk in the family Flabellinidae.

Distribution
This species is found in depths to 50 m in European waters in the Atlantic Ocean from Portugal to Ghana and the Canaries and is widespread in the Mediterranean Sea.

Description
The species can grow to a length of  50 mm. It feeds primarily on species of Eudendrium, a very common hydroid genus in the Mediterranean Sea.

Flabellina affinis is often confused with Paraflabellina ischitana, but can be distinguished as follows:

Flabellina affinis: the outer part of the digestive gland in each ceras is not visible as the area beneath the subapical white ring is opaque violet in colour.
Paraflabellina ischitana: the ceratal surface has no purple-violet colouration and is translucent.

References

External links
 
 Photo study of the Flabellina affinis

Flabellinidae
Gastropods described in 1791
Taxa named by Johann Friedrich Gmelin
Molluscs of the Atlantic Ocean
Molluscs of the Mediterranean Sea
Molluscs of the Canary Islands
Invertebrates of West Africa
Molluscs of Europe